Lingxia Township is a township of Pingnan County in mountainous northeastern Fujian province, China, located  north of the county seat in the northern reaches of the county. , it has 11 villages under its administration.

See also 
 List of township-level divisions of Fujian

References 

Township-level divisions of Fujian